Shepperd Strudwick (September 22, 1907 – January 15, 1983) was an American actor of film, television, and stage. He was also billed as John Shepperd for some of his films and for his acting on stage in New York.

Early years
Strudwick was born in Hillsborough, North Carolina. He attended Virginia Episcopal School in Lynchburg, Virginia, and  the University of North Carolina. At the university, he played football and basketball and ran the mile in track. He gained early acting experience in a summer stock theatre company in Maine.

Career
He began his film career as the title character in the short film Joaquin Murrieta (1938), credited as Sheppard Strudwick. He appeared as Yugoslav guerrilla leader Lt. Aleksa Petrovic, an aide to General Draza Mihailovich, in the 20th Century Fox war film Chetniks! The Fighting Guerrillas in 1943.

During World War II, Strudwick served in the Navy.

He played Edgar Allan Poe in The Loves of Edgar Allan Poe (1942) and also appeared in Strange Triangle (1946), Fighter Squadron (1948), The Reckless Moment (1949), The Red Pony (1949), Under the Gun (1951), and A Place in the Sun (1951), starring Elizabeth Taylor and Montgomery Clift, as the Taylor character's father.

Perhaps his most famous film role was that of Adam Stanton, the idealistic doctor who finally kills Willie Stark (played by Broderick Crawford) in the classic film All the King's Men (1949). Another notable role was Father Jean Massieu in Joan of Arc (1948), starring Ingrid Bergman as Joan.

Strudwick made many appearances on television, including the role of Dr. Charles Morris in the 1958 Perry Mason episode, "The Case of the Fugitive Nurse." He also appeared on The Twilight Zone, (in the episode "Nightmare as a Child") and several roles on the soap operas As the World Turns (Dr. Fields), Another World (Jim Matthews), One Life to Live (Victor Lord), and Love of Life (Timothy McCauley). In 1981, he starred as the voice of Homer in the National Radio Theater's Peabody Award-winning radio dramatization of the Odyssey.

His last appearance on film was in 1981's Kent State, a TV film. That same year, he was nominated for the Tony Award for Best Actor (Featured Role – Play) for the Broadway play To Grandmother's House We Go.

Strudwick acted in at least 30 Broadway plays, beginning with The Yellow Jacket (1929), and ending with To Grandmother's House We Go (1981).

Personal life
Strudwick married Helen Wynn, (born Helen R. Sims), with whom he acted in stock theatre in Maine, on May 10, 1936, in New York City. They had a son in 1944. In 1949, he was married to Jean Mead, who had worked for the British Information Service. Strudwick was married to Mary Jeffrey from 1977 until his death. He died in New York City from cancer on January 15, 1983, at the age of 75.

Filmography

Film

Fast Company (1938) as Ned Morgan (film debut)
Old Glory (1939, Short) as Paul Revere (voice, uncredited) 
Congo Maisie (1940) as Dr. John McWade
Mighty Hunters (1940, Short) as Narrator (voice, uncredited) 
Dr. Kildare's Strange Case (1940) as Dr. Gregory 'Greg' Lane
Tom Thumb in Trouble (1940, Short) as Narrator/Tom Thumb's Father (voice, uncredited) 
The Mortal Storm (1940) as Narrator (uncredited)
Flight Command (1940) - Lieut. Jerry Banning
Belle Starr (1941) as Ed Shirley
The Men in Her Life (1941) as Roger Chevis 
Cadet Girl (1941) as Bob Mallory
Remember the Day (1941) as Dewey Roberts
Rings on Her Fingers (1942) as Tod Fenwick
Ten Gentlemen from West Point (1942) as Henry Clay
The Loves of Edgar Allan Poe (1942) as Edgar Allan Poe
Dr. Renault's Secret (1942) as Dr. Larry Forbes
Chetniks! The Fighting Guerrillas (1943) as Lt. Aleksa Petrovic
Strange Triangle (1946) as Earl Huber
Home, Sweet Homicide (1946) as Mr.Wallace Sanford
Joan of Arc (1948) as Father Massieu (Joan's bailiff)
Fighter Squadron (1948) as Brig. Gen. Mel Gilbert
Enchantment (1948) as Marchese Del Laudi
The Red Pony (1949) as Mr. Fred Tiflin
Reign of Terror (1949) as Napoleon Bonaparte (voice, uncredited)
The Reckless Moment (1949) as Ted Darby
Chicago Deadline (1949) as Edgar 'Blacky' Franchot
All the King's Men (1949) as Adam Stanton
The Kid from Texas (1950) as Roger Jameson
Let's Dance (1950) as Timothy Bryant
Three Husbands (1950) as Arthur Evans
A Place in the Sun (1951) as Anthony "Tony" Vickers
Under the Gun (1951) as Milo Bragg
The Eddy Duchin Story (1956) as Sherman Wadsworth
Autumn Leaves (1956) as Dr. Malcolm Couzzens
Beyond a Reasonable Doubt (1956) as Jonathan Wilson
That Night! (1957) as Dr. Bernard Fischer
The Sad Sack (1957) as Major General Vanderlip
Girl on the Run (1958) as James McCullough/Ralph Graham
Violent Midnight (1963) as Adrian Benedict
Daring Game (1968) as Dr. Henry L. Carlyle
Slaves (1969) as Mr. Stillwell
The Monitors (1969) as Tersh Jeterax
Cops and Robbers (1973) as Mr. Eastpoole (final film)

Television

Wagon Train (1957) as Colonel Charles E. Beauchamp 
Perry Mason (1958) as Dr. Charles Morris 
Have Gun - Will Travel (1960) as Colonel Benjamin Nunez 
77 Sunset Strip (1960) as James McCullough 
Thriller (1960) as Douglas Kilburn 
The Barbara Stanwyck Show (1960) as Bill Mowry 
The Twilight Zone (1961) as Peter Selden ("Nightmare as a Child" episode)
One Life to Live (1968) as Victor Lord
McMillan & Wife (1971) as Rudolph Dimrose 
The Adams Chronicles (1976) as Dr. Hooper 
Love of Life (1980) as Timothy McCauley 
Nurse (1982) as William Mercier (final appearance)

Radio
National Radio Theater: Odyssey as Homer

Stage
To Grandmother's House We Go, Broadway play

Awards
Tony Award for Best Play (Feature Role – Play):
To Grandmother's House We Go - Nominated

References

External links

Shepperd Strudwick papers, 1927-1983, held by the Billy Rose Theatre Division, New York Public Library for the Performing Arts
Shepperd Strudwick at the University of Wisconsin's Actors Studio audio collection

1907 births
1983 deaths
American male film actors
American male soap opera actors
American male stage actors
American male television actors
People from Hillsborough, North Carolina
Deaths from cancer in New York (state)
Male actors from North Carolina
20th-century American male actors
University of North Carolina alumni